Abronia lythrochila is a species of lizard in the family Anguidae known by the common name red-lipped arboreal alligator lizard.

Distribution
This species is endemic to the state of Chiapas in Mexico.

Habitat
This species lives in montane dry pine-oak forest, at an elevation of 2000–3000 m. It has a relatively small range but it is common there; it is threatened by deforestation but much of its range is in protected areas, including Lagunas de Montebello National Park.

Description
These lizards can reach a length of about 7 – 11 Inches. The basic body colour is greenish-olive, with irregular dark blotches. They show spiny horn-like scales on each sides of the head, The infralabials are blood-red (hence the common name). The tail is prehensile.

Biology
They mainly feed on insects.

References

External links
 Reptiles Magazine

Abronia
Endemic reptiles of Mexico
Reptiles described in 1963